The ringed kingfisher (Megaceryle torquata) is a large, conspicuous, and noisy kingfisher bird commonly found along the lower Rio Grande Valley in southeasternmost Texas in the United States through Central America to Tierra del Fuego in South America.

Description 
Megaceryle torquata is a Neotropical kingfisher that lives in habitats ranging between the US and Mexico. In 1888, the species was first discovered in the US, while the first ringed kingfisher nest was found in 1970. They are commonly seen along the Rio Grande and in water bodies in southern Texas. Their distribution is increasing and expanding northwards.

Measurement 
Such measurements prove that the species do not differ sexually in terms of size.

Identification 
Ringed kingfishers have dark-brown irises that are consistent among all age groups. They have straight bills that are longer than their heads, along with curved culmens and tomial serrations. The lower mandible appears to have some yellowish colorations. They possess syndactil feet with olive-green or yellowish toes and black claws. A large crest appears between the base of their bills and necks. Several individuals have a white collar located around the neck.

Plumage 
Each ringed kingfisher possesses 10 primary wings, 15 secondaries, three tertials, and 12 rectrices. They are rounded, and the tail is squared. Subspecies can be found in Texas, Mexico, Central America, and South America, due to slight plumage differences. Individuals themselves vary slightly as a result of variable environmental constraints and day-length regimes.

Sexual dimorphism 
Ringed kingfishers can be identified by sex due to differences in coloration. The males possess rusty-brown underparts with white undertail coverts and a white throat. Females have a bluish-gray band seen on upper breast and a whitish band.

Eggs 
A ringed kingfisher's clutch size is typically three to six eggs, which are incubated for about 22 days.

Taxonomy 
The ringed kingfisher is from the family Alcedinidae in the order Coraciiformes. The ringed kingfisher is related to the belted kingfisher. Overall, the species appears much larger than its counterpart, while possessing a rufous belly, a massive bill and a blue back.

Subspecies 
Three subspecies are identified by size and color, as well as location.

M. t. torquata  is found in regions of southern Texas and southern Sinaloa, Central America to South America, and throughout the Amazon basin, Argentina, and Uruguay, as well as Isla Margarita in Venezuela.
M. t. stictipennis is found in the Lesser Antilles, Dominica, and Martinique. Individuals have secondary feathers with white spots that reach outer part of the feathers. The dorsum appears to be darker blue or gray.
 M. t. stellate  has breeding ranges and wintering grounds located in Chile and the southern part of Argentina. Its undertail coverts are spotted heavily with dark-blue or gray coloration, with spotted or dusky underwing coverts, dorm appears to be dark blue to gray, and the outer webs of their secondary wings do not appear to have white spots. Their bills measure less than 69 mm.

Habitat and distribution

Habitat 

Ringed kingfishers are seen in freshwater habitats, tropical and temperate marine shorelines, and several islands, such as Coiba Island. Breeding occurs in aquatic regions with support of aquatic animals, including fish-populated areas for nesting burrows. Nests can be found farther away from water. Habitats are near waterbodies that include streams, rivers, ponds, lakes, estuaries, and marine habitats. Habitats with clear water and less vegetation are preferred to easily access prey.

Distribution 
Ringed kingfishers are found in broad areas between Texas, USA and South America. The ranges of ringed and belted kingfishers overlap from Central America and above for 6–8 months. Ringed kingfishers also have ranges that overlap with other kingfisher species in Central and South America. Breeding ranges of ringed kingfishers vary in the Neotropics in Mexico, the Caribbean and South America. Their preference for mangrove habitats has been observed in the tropics. Foraging occurs offshore as far as 1 km (.7 mi). Overwintering areas are indifferent to breeding ranges, but are able to forage farther than during their breeding periods. Large irrigation canals in Rio Grande, Texas have been used as wintering grounds by such species. They are usually found in areas with high fish densities during the dry season.

Behavior

Locomotion 

The anatomy of ringed kingfishers prevent efficient terrestrial movements. Individuals shuffle into and out of nesting burrows, so displacing between branches is difficult for this species. They possess strong wings that beat very slow as a result of their size.  They are able to fly over land for long periods of time in comparison to other species of kingfishers.

Breeding

Mating ritual 
A mating ritual involves the male ringed kingfisher offering fish to the female before copulation. The pair perform where the male creates calls while circling above the water, while dropping into the water. This process lasts for a short time.

Parental behavior 
Female and male ringed kingfishers incubate their eggs while performing other duties equally. Short foraging breaks are taken during late afternoon, since incubation periods are long. Each individual take turns during the morning. Incubating birds are capable of finding prey by regurgitating their undigested food to attract flies in their burrows.

Vocalization 

Ringed kingfishers have louder and lower-pitched calls compared to the belted kingfisher. Captured Juveniles have been heard to scream, giving a klek or kek call. The same call is heard during human intervention or other disturbances. A softer klek is produced by the adult to signal its incubating partner. Its common vocalizations are described as rattles.

Foraging behavior 
Ringed kingfishers can perch for several hours on trees while watching for prey in fresh water. Belted kingfishers perch for only a few moments. Ringed kingfishers have also been observed to forage in marine water. They catch their prey by diving from a perch.

Diet 
The ringed kingfisher's diet is largely dependent on fish, but they sometimes target crabs and other crustaceans. Fish consumed include several species from the families Characidae and Cichlidae.

Threats

Diseases 
A parasitic infection caused by Pulchrosopa pulchrosopa, a type of flatworm, causes internal damage in the respiratory system of ringed kingfishers. Infected individuals were examined, with the species found in their lungs, tracheae, and coelomic cavities. The parasite migrates to the lungs as the host experiences stressful or immunosuppressive periods. The parasite also causes significant damage to tissues due to its migration to the lungs.

Predation 
Predators of ringed kingfishers include the white-tailed hawk, sharp-shinned hawk, bald eagle, golden eagle, and peregrine falcon.

Conservation status 
The IUCN considers the ringed kingfisher to be of least concern. Increasing population trends indicate that the species is not vulnerable, as it is widespread and has a large habitat distribution and breeding ranges.

References 

ringed kingfisher
Birds of the Rio Grande valleys
Birds of Central America
Birds of Saint Kitts and Nevis
Birds of the Caribbean
Birds of South America
ringed kingfisher
ringed kingfisher